Mamadou Fall may refer to:
 Mamadou Fall (footballer, born 1991)
 Mamadou Fall (footballer, born 2002)